William F. Miller (November 19, 1925 – September 27, 2017) was an American academic who was professor public and private management emeritus and a professor of computer science emeritus. He was a vice president and provost of Stanford University from 1971 to 1979, and president and CEO of SRI International from 1979 to 1990. He died in September 2017 at the age of 91.

Early life and education
Miller was born in Vincennes, Indiana. He attended Purdue University, where he earned a B.S. in 1949, an M.S. in experimental physics in 1951, and a Ph.D. in theoretical physics in 1956.

Career
Miller was a director of the Applied Mathematics Division at Argonne National Laboratory, where he worked on problems in computational science. Miller was recruited to the faculty of Stanford University in 1964 by Frederick Terman, who was Stanford's vice president and provost at the time. From 1971 to 1979, Miller was the vice president and provost of Stanford University.  From 1979 to 1990, Miller was the president and CEO of SRI International, where he focused on expanding the organization's business in the Pacific Rim and acquired the Sarnoff Corporation as a subsidiary of SRI. Miller has been a member of numerous boards of directors, including but not limited to Wells Fargo, Borland International, McKenna Group, Palyn-Gould Group, Who Where?, Quest Gen and the BHP International Advisory Council. He was an initial investor in Mayfield Fund, an early venture capital organization.

Awards and honors

Miller was given an honorary Doctor of Science degree from his alma mater, Purdue University, in 1972. In 1989, Tau Beta Pi recognized him as an Eminent Engineer.

References

1925 births
2017 deaths
Argonne National Laboratory people
Members of the United States National Academy of Engineering
People from Vincennes, Indiana
Purdue University alumni
SRI International people
Stanford University Graduate School of Business faculty